Giannis Kanotidis (born 2 May 1979) is a Greek footballer. He currently plays for Panthrakikos F.C. in Beta Ethniki.

Career
Career statistics

Last update: 21 July 2011

References

External links

Panthracrocs
Guardian

1979 births
Living people
Greek footballers
Athlitiki Enosi Larissa F.C. players
Kastoria F.C. players
Kavala F.C. players
Olympiacos Volos F.C. players
Kalamata F.C. players
Panthrakikos F.C. players
Association football defenders